Hamtaro: Ham-Hams Unite! is an adventure video game developed by Pax Softnica and published by Nintendo for the Game Boy Color handheld video game console. It is based on the Hamtaro anime and features much of the same characters. It launched in Japan in 2001, and later came to North America and Europe in 2002 and 2003 respectively. It was the final video game published on the Game Boy Color by Nintendo. Players control the hamster Hamtaro, who is tasked with gathering his friends and returning them to the clubhouse as well as collecting words missing from the Hamchat dictionary.

The game received generally positive reception, with reviewers such as IGN and Eurogamer noting its success as both a game for children and a game that could appeal to older audiences. It was the seventh best-selling game for the Game Boy Color in Japan. The successor of the 2000 Game Boy Color game Tottoko Hamtaro: Tomodachi Daisakusen Dechu, it was followed by Hamtaro: Ham-Ham Heartbreak in 2003 for the Game Boy Advance which featured similar gameplay mechanics.

Gameplay and premise

Players control protagonist Hamtaro as they seek out the various members of his clubhouse and attempts to fill in the Hamchat dictionary. He is tasked to do this by Boss, who also teaches him basic Hamchat words. Several of the characters from the anime, such as Bijou and Oxnard, are featured in the game as characters Hamtaro must seek out. Players do this using the appropriate dialogue options to solve puzzles and appease other hamsters. Players have four Hamchat words as options by default: "Hamha" for talking, "Digdig" for digging, "Tack-Q" for tackling, and "Hif-Hif" for sniffing, all of which allow players to interact with characters and environments and may help progress the story.

Hamchat words are accompanied by gestures. There are other words that players learn throughout the game that can be used in contextual situations. Characters may require words that are not yet available, indicated by question marks included in the dialogue choices, in order to fully interact with them. These words are unlocked by interacting with other characters. Sunflower seeds are a currency that can be exchanged for clothing items which Hamtaro can wear, which players can trade with each other using the Game Boy Color's infra-red port. The game features mini-games, including Ham-Jam where players can dance to the game's music using different Hamchat words, and Tack-Q Bowling.

Development
Hamtaro: Ham-Hams Unite! was developed by Pax Softnica and published by Nintendo for the Game Boy Color. It was released in Japan on April 21, 2001, North America on October 28, 2002, and in Europe on January 10, 2003. It was the final video game released for the Game Boy Color by Nintendo. French localizers made attempts to make the language options in the game as explicit as possible to help players learn. It is a sequel to the 2000 Game Boy Color release Tottoko Hamtaro: Tomodachi Daisakusen Dechu. It was followed by Hamtaro: Ham-Ham Heartbreak for the Game Boy Advance in 2003, which was also developed by Pax Softnica and published by Nintendo and featured similar gameplay.

Reception

Hamtaro: Ham-Hams Unite! has received generally positive reception since its release. It is the seventh best-selling Game Boy Color game in Japan, with 497,061 copies sold. Nintendo Power praised it for its "clever and amusing" design. GamePro and X-Play expected it to be a success among children, with GamePro calling its gameplay "oddly compelling. IGN found it to be original and engrossing for all ages, praising its visuals and animations relative to other Game Boy Color games. Eurogamer similarly praised efforts to make the game appealing to all ages while also commending Nintendo for making a game about a language barrier. Jeux Video praised the visuals and the dialogue mechanics, calling it amusing. It found the music lacking, suggesting that it and other Game Boy Color music would only appeal to a limited audience. Famitsu felt that it was cute, though thought it may be difficult for small children to play. Nintendo World Report was critical of the game, praising its aesthetic but feeling that its puzzles were illogical and gameplay nonexistent. Writer Jacob Whritenour praised it for capturing the feel of the anime it is based on.

References

External links
  

2001 video games
Adventure games
Game Boy Color games
Game Boy Color-only games
Hamtaro (video game series)
Video games developed in Japan
Single-player video games
Nintendo games
Pax Softnica games